Justice Hathaway may refer to:

Diane Hathaway, associate justice of the Michigan Supreme Court
Joshua W. Hathaway, associate justice of the Maine Supreme Judicial Court